The Gate River Run (GRR), formerly known as the Jacksonville River Run, is an annual  road running event in Jacksonville, Florida, United States, that attracts both competitive and recreational runners. It has functioned as the US National Championship 15K since 1994, and in 2007 became the largest 15K race in the country. It "was voted [as] one of the top US Road Races for last 20 years by Runner's World Magazine." Local news media describe it as "one of Jacksonville's premiere annual events."

History
The race was established by the Jacksonville Track Club (now JTC Running) in 1978 when it was known as the Jacksonville River Run. The initial sponsor of the race was the Florida Publishing Company, which published the Florida Times-Union and Jacksonville Journal. An inspiration for the race was the Peachtree Road Race, a 10,000 meter road race sponsored for several years by the Atlanta Journal-Constitution. An initial planning meeting was held at the Jacksonville YMCA, with representatives of the Y, the newspaper and members of the Jacksonville Track Club. The 15,000-meter distance was proposed, to distinguish the race from the Atlanta race and the plethora of 10K road races then spreading across the country as a result of the running boom. The course crosses two major bridges spanning the St. Johns River, giving the race its name.

Running legend Bill Rodgers, who is a four-time winner of both the New York City and Boston Marathons, won the first River Run. He was invited by the organizers, pending an appearance fee of $1,000, which was an under-the-table payment because of the amateur status of so many world-class athletes at that time. There was no other appearance or prize money offered. Rodgers' powerful victory helped catapult the event into the national running consciousness. On the women's side, Kim Merritt, a national-class  runner in a period when women were first beginning to be taken seriously at longer distances, took home the distaff honors.

Gate Petroleum became the underwriting sponsor in 1994. Todd Williams holds the American 15K record with a time of 42:22 at the 1995 GRR, which he won five times. Shalane Flanagan, won in 2014 and set the new women's record with 47:00. Before that, Deena Drossin, who has won the GRR six times, held the women's record with 47:15 at the GRR in 2003.

An equalizer was added in 2004. The difference in time between the women's and men's 15K national records was 4:53, so the elite women runners got a five-minute head start on the elite men. The first finisher, man or woman, receives a $5,000 bonus. Even so, the women had only won the prize once (in 2007). In 2012, the equalizer was increased to 6:35, and Janet Cherobon won the $5,000 bonus that year and in 2013.

Race details
In 2013, total prize money exceeded $85,000, including bonus money for record-breaking performances. The event has more prize money than any major non-marathon event in the United States. There are separate but equal awards for men and women individuals, teams and masters (over 40).

Live bands perform at locations along the race course and the finish line is beside TIAA Bank Field. Special running caps are given to the top 10 percent of racers and medals are given to all 15K finishers.

There is a 3-day runner's expo, with dozens of vendor representatives promoting running and health-related products. Seminars with running themes are presented; typical topics are:
Hydration and Nutrition, Foot and Ankle Injuries, Shin Splits and Shoe Fitting, Basic Injury Care. Bill Rodgers was a special guest at the expo in 2013, talking about running and signing autographs.

Following the race, Publix supermarkets hosts a celebration at the fairgrounds.

In 2013, 17,454 people registered for the race, with 15,569 runners actually completing it.
The winner was Ben True from Hanover, New Hampshire with a time of 43:38. The fastest woman in 2013 was Janet Cherobon-Bawcom, from Rome, Georgia at 49:44.  The related races, the Florida Times-Union 5K Run & Walk for Charity, and the one-mile Junior River Run had 2,041 and 1,873 participants, respectively.

Doug Alred, who has served as race director for 31 of the 36 years of the race, said that 2013 was the 11th consecutive year of record entries.

Streakers
Upon completion of the 2021 race, there were 26 Streakers, defined as an individual who has completed every River Run.
During the 2013 race, one of the Streakers collapsed with a heart attack, but was given CPR by firefighters who were also running the race, and was revived with a defibrillator from a quickly responding emergency unit.

Hall of Fame
The Gate River Run Hall of Fame was established in 2002 and is permanently located in the Riverplace Tower, on the southbank in downtown Jacksonville. Memorabilia dating from the race's inception in 1978 up to the present is on display and a five-minute video gives visitors an overview of the race. Plaques for each of the 14 persons inducted into the HOF are on display.

Past winners
Key:

References

External links
Official Race website
Official Race Producer website
Official Team Gate website
 Race Winners of the Jacksonville River Run at arrs.run

Sports competitions in Jacksonville, Florida
15K runs
Tourist attractions in Jacksonville, Florida
Road running competitions in the United States
Gate Petroleum
1978 establishments in Florida
Recurring sporting events established in 1978